Hightown railway station serves the village of Hightown in Merseyside, England.  The station is located on the Southport branch of the Merseyrail network's Northern Line.

History
Hightown opened in 1848 as an intermediate station on the Liverpool, Crosby and Southport Railway (LCSR).

It became part of the Lancashire and Yorkshire Railway (LYR), on 14 June 1855, which had absorbed the LCSR. The Lancashire and Yorkshire Railway amalgamated with the London and North Western Railway on 1 January 1922 and in turn amalgamated with other railways to create the London, Midland and Scottish Railway in 1923.

Nationalisation followed in 1948 and in 1978 the station became part of the Merseyrail network's Northern Line (operated by British Rail until privatisation in 1995).

In February 2019, as part of the Merseyrail platform upgrade works, both of the platforms were raised in preparation for the British Rail Class 777 METRO units, coming into operation in 2020.

The station is staffed, from 15 minutes before the first train until 15 minutes after the last train.

Platform 1 (Southbound) has a waiting room, ticket office, cycle storage and a photo booth, whilst Platform 2 (Northbound) has a shelter, a payphone and cycle storage. There are live dot-matrix departure screens, for passenger information and platform CCTV on both platforms. The platforms are linked via a stepped bridge but both may be accessed via road.

Services
Northbound trains operate to Southport, and Southbound trains to Hunts Cross via Liverpool Central.

On Mondays to Saturdays there are four trains an hour throughout the day in each direction; on Sundays there are two per hour.

Gallery

References

External links

Railway stations in the Metropolitan Borough of Sefton
DfT Category E stations
Former Lancashire and Yorkshire Railway stations
Railway stations in Great Britain opened in 1848
Railway stations served by Merseyrail